The River is a 1984 American drama film directed by Mark Rydell, written by Robert Dillon and Julian Barry, and starring Sissy Spacek, Mel Gibson, and Scott Glenn. The film tells the story of a struggling farm family in the Tennessee valley trying to keep its farm from going under in the face of bank foreclosures and floods. The father faces the dilemma of having to work as a strikebreaker in a steel mill to keep his family farm from foreclosure. It was based on the true story of farmers who unknowingly took jobs as strikebreakers at a steel mill after their crops had been destroyed by rain.

The River was theatrically released on December 19, 1984, by Universal Pictures. It received mixed reviews, with critics praising Spacek's performance and the cinematography, but criticizing the screenplay, execution, and Gibson's performance, whom many considered to have been miscast. It was a box office failure, grossing only $11.5 million against an $18 million budget. Despite that, it received four nominations at the 57th Academy Awards; Best Actress (for Spacek), Best Original Score, Best Sound, Best Cinematography, and won the Special Achievement Award.

Plot

Tom and Mae Garvey are a hard-working couple living with their two children on the east Tennessee farm owned by Tom's family for generations. They and many of their neighbors have hit hard times as of late. A downturn in the economy has led to dwindling land prices. But their biggest problem has been that their crop land has been prone to flooding as the property is adjacent to a river. Manipulating the powers that be include local senator Neiswinder and the local bank. Joe Wade, who also grew up in the area and now runs the local milling company that sets the local grain prices, is working behind the scenes to buy up the properties along the river for a song as he wants to build a dam that would flood the Garvey's and other riverfront properties. The dam would generate electricity but more importantly for Joe, it would provide irrigation opportunities for farm properties away from the river, such as his own. Tom already intensely dislikes Joe because he and Mae used to be a couple. Joe's maneuverings coupled with the continuation of these and many other farming problems makes it increasingly difficult for Tom and Mae to hold on to their farm, as Tom is determined at any cost to have it stay on the land of his ancestors. Tom begins work at a steel factory in order to prevent foreclosure on his farm. without knowing he becomes a strikebreaker. The strike ends and he is required to go home to his family and work on the farm. The Garvey family is left alone while tom is working and Mae is involved in an accident on the farm where she loses a lot of blood and almost her arm. She and joe share a moment. A moment that the audience does not support but nothing comes of it. In the end they are able to keep the farm and have a successful harvest but the original problem of the floods doesn't get resolved. The happiness is short lived.

Cast

 Sissy Spacek as Mae Garvey
 Mel Gibson as Tom Garvey
 Shane Bailey as Lewis Garvey
 Becky Jo Lynch as Beth Garvey
 Scott Glenn as Joe Wade
 Don Hood as Senator Neiswinder
 Billy "Green" Bush as Harve Stanley
 James Tolkan as Howard Simpson
 Jack Starrett as foreman Swick

Production
Director Mark Rydell viewed the characters in this drama as iconicly American, and he was eager to cast Sissy Spacek as the farm wife because of her performance in Coal Miner's Daughter and her home on a farm near Charlottesville, Virginia. Rydell said, "She is the consummate American rural young woman, with strength and fiber and a luminous quality." Mel Gibson begged Rydell to let him play the Tennessee farmer who reminded him of his father, but the director was reluctant because of Gibson's Australian accent. Before Gibson left for England to film The Bounty, he begged Rydell not to cast the part yet. Rydell recalled, "He came back to my house in Los Angeles and started reading the script, talking, reading the newspaper, in this perfect Tennessee accent. I was really impressed, even when he stood next to Sissy, who's like a tuning fork when it comes to accents, he had damn well done it."

The River was filmed in the Holston Valley area of Church Hill, Tennessee. The filmmakers purchased  along the Holston River for the farm set and planted corn. Most of the filming was done along Goshen Valley Road and around the Goshen Valley Park area. Goshen Valley Road heads south from highway 11W in Church Hill, Tennessee. The cast and their families moved to the area a month before the start of production to connect with the local people and learn farming skills. The floods in the film were supplied by the Tennessee Valley Authority and the Army Corps of Engineers with water from the Fort Patrick Henry Dam. The bank and downtown scenes were filmed in the town of Gate City, Virginia.  The tent city and a few other scenes were filmed in Kingsport, Tennessee, while some factory scenes were filmed in Birmingham, Alabama. Scenes that were filmed at Double Springs Baptist Church in Jonesborough, Tennessee did not make the final cut of the movie.  The film was completed for under $18 million.

Music
The musical score was composed and conducted by John Williams and also featured songs by country artists including George Strait.

It was announced that Intrada Records will release an expanded and remastered version of Williams' score on May 5, 2020. The new release will feature the complete score (including previous and unheard content) and the original soundtrack album.

Reception

The River was the last of three 1984 films, including Country and Places in the Heart, that shared the themes of a family's devotion to their farm, the destructive force of nature, an unsympathetic bureaucracy and a determined woman who binds her family together.

The film received negative reviews, with praise for Sissy Spacek's performance being a notable exception. On Rotten Tomatoes, it holds an approval rating of 24% on Rotten Tomatoes from 21 critics. Mel Gibson later regretted that his portrayal of Tom Garvey was so stubborn that the audience lost sympathy, and said that he had been miscast for the role because he was too young and "pretty" at the time.

The film opened Wednesday, December 19, 1984, in 3 theaters and grossed $40,540 in its first seven days to Christmas Day and went on to gross $11.5 million in the United States and Canada.

Awards
The film was nominated for Academy Awards in Best Actress in a Leading Role (Sissy Spacek), Best Cinematography, Best Music, Original Score and Best Sound (Nick Alphin, Robert Thirlwell, Richard Portman and David M. Ronne). It also received a special Oscar for sound effects editing (Kay Rose).

See also 
List of river films and television series

References

External links
 
 
 
 
 

1984 films
1984 drama films
American drama films
1980s English-language films
Films about farmers
Films scored by John Williams
Films directed by Mark Rydell
Films set on farms
Films set in Tennessee
Films shot in Tennessee
Films about agriculture
Films that won the Best Sound Editing Academy Award
Universal Pictures films
1980s American films